Farmington State Hospital No. 4 Cemetery is a historic cemetery located near Farmington, St. Francois County, Missouri.  It was established in 1903, and is a rectangular plot measuring 180 feet by 450 feet.  The cemetery is divided into 24 sections each containing 50 graves marked by simple wooden crosses.  The entrance is marked by two concrete pillars molded to look like stylized columns.  The cemetery was established as the burial ground for Missouri State Hospital #4.

It was added to the National Register of Historic Places in 2010.

References

External links
 
 

Cemeteries on the National Register of Historic Places in Missouri
1903 establishments in Missouri
Buildings and structures in St. Francois County, Missouri
National Register of Historic Places in St. Francois County, Missouri